Defile may refer to:

 To make dirty or impure
 Defile (geography), in geography, a narrow pass or gorge between mountains
 Defile (military), to march off in a line
 The Defile, a pass between Suess Glacier and Nussbaum Riegel in Victoria Land, Antarctica
 Battle of the Defile or Battle of the Pass, 731 battle between the Umayyads and Turks

See also
 File (disambiguation)
 Contamination
 Pollution